Battle of Uji refers to one of three 12th and 13th century battles fought in Japan:
Battle of Uji (1180), First Battle of Uji
Battle of Uji (1184), Second Battle of Uji
Battle of Uji (1221), Third Battle of Uji